Delmar station could refer to:

 Del Mar station, a light rail station in Pasadena, California
 Del Mar station, a former Amtrak station in Del Mar, California, replaced in 1994 by Solana Beach station
 Delmar station (Iowa), a disused train station
 Delmar Boulevard station, a disused train station in St. Louis, Missouri
 Delmar Loop station, a light rail station beneath the above station in St. Louis, Missouri